Amarbayasgalangiin Saikhanchuluun (born 28 August 1996) is a Mongolian footballer who plays as goalkeeper for Mongolian Premier League club Ulaanbaatar City and the Mongolian national team.

Club career
Amarbayasgalan played for Khangarid FC of the Mongolian Premier League from 2009 through the 2017 season. During his final year with the club, he was ranked seventh among goalkeepers in the league with a 72.9 save percentage. On 7 November 2017 it was announced that he was transferred to fellow-Premier League club Ulaanbaatar City FC on a 3–year, 9 million MNT deal. There was a transfer fee of 2 million MNT.

International career
Amarbayasgalan made his senior international debut on 5 October 2017 in a 2–4 friendly defeat to Chinese Taipei. He previously represented Mongolia at the under-23 level in 2018 AFC U-23 Championship qualification.

International career statistics

References

External links
MFF profile
National Football Teams profile

1996 births
Living people
Mongolian footballers
Association football goalkeepers
Ulaanbaatar City FC players
Mongolia international footballers